Arizona's 2nd Legislative District is one of 30 in the state, consisting of all of Santa Cruz County, along with a section of Pima County. As of 2020 there are 57 precincts in the district, 33 in Pima and 24 in Santa Cruz, with a total registered voter population of 119,080. The district has an overall population of 211,905.

Political representation
The district is represented for the 2021–2022 Legislative Session in the State Senate by Rosanna Gabaldón (D, Sahuarita) and in the House of Representatives by Daniel Hernández Jr. (D, Tucson) and Andrea Dalessandro (D, Green Valley).

See also
 List of Arizona Legislative Districts
 Arizona State Legislature

References

Pima County, Arizona
Santa Cruz County, Arizona
Arizona legislative districts